USS Firecrest (AMS-10/YMS-231) was an  acquired by the U.S. Navy for clearing coastal minefields during World War II.

Firecrest was laid down 5 October 1942 by Frank L. Sample, Jr., Boothbay Harbor, Maine; launched, 3 April 1943; completed and commissioned USS YMS-231, 6 August 1943.

She was decommissioned in February 1947; named Firecrest and reclassified as a Motor minesweeper, AMS-10, 18 February 1947.

Firecrest returned to service in the later 1940s. She was sent to Korea in 1950 and operated in the combat zone until the shooting ended in July 1953. Firecrest continued to serve in the Far East after the war. She was reclassified as a Coastal minesweeper, Old, MSC(O)-10, 7 February 1955.

Firecrest was transferred to Japan, 15 March 1955 as Etajima (MSC-656). She was returned to U. S. custody in 1967 and struck from the Naval Register, 31 March 1967. Firecrest was disposed of as a target in August 1969.

References

External links 
 

YMS-1-class minesweepers of the United States Navy
Ships built in Boothbay Harbor, Maine
1943 ships
World War II minesweepers of the United States
Korean War minesweepers of the United States
YMS-1-class minesweepers of the Japan Maritime Self-Defense Force